Monacia-d'Aullène is a commune in the Corse-du-Sud department of France on the island of Corsica.

It is part of the canton of Grand Sud.

Geography
It was created in 1864 by dividing Aullène. To the southwest, the commune has an opening to the coast between Point Roccapino to the northwest and the Cala di Furnellu. The latter is preceded by Caniscione Point, on which is the Genoese Tower of Olmeto.

Population

See also
Communes of the Corse-du-Sud department

References

Communes of Corse-du-Sud